Bleachers (North American English), or stands, are raised, tiered rows of benches found at sports fields and other spectator events.  Stairways provide access to the horizontal rows of seats, often with every other step gaining access to a row of benches.

Benches range from simple planks to elaborate ones with backrests.  Many bleachers are open to the ground below so that there are only the planks to sit and walk on. Some bleachers have vertical panels beneath the benches, either partially or completely blocking the way to the ground.

Name origins 
The open seating area in baseball was called the "bleaching boards" as early as 1877. The term "bleachers" used in the sense of benches for spectators can be traced back to at least 1889; named as such because the generally uncovered wooden boards were "bleached by the sun".

The Dickson Baseball Dictionary lists as a secondary definition the fans sitting in them. By the early 1900s, the term "bleachers" was being used for both the seating area and its occupants.

In modern usage, the term "bleachers" almost always refers only to the seating area, and those sitting there may be called "bleacher fans" or "bleacherites". Terms such as Chicago's "bleacher bums" or Yankee Stadium's Bleacher Creatures are also used.

Types 
Bleachers structures vary depending on the location, but most outdoor modern bleachers have either an aluminium tube or steel angle understructure (known as frame-type bleachers) or steel I-beams (known as an I-beam bleacher). Most smaller bleachers are frame-type bleachers and most larger bleachers are I-Beam bleachers. Bleachers range in size from small, modular, aluminum stands that can be moved around soccer or hockey fields to large permanent structures that flank each side of an American football field. Some bleachers have locker rooms underneath them. In indoor gyms, bleachers can be built in so that they slide on a track or on wheels and fold in an accordion-like, stacking manner. These type of bleachers are known as telescoping bleachers.

Baseball 
In ballparks, the bleachers are usually located beyond the outfield fences. However, center-field bleachers are located in the line of sight of the batter, and the presence of fans makes it difficult for the batter to pick out the ball. As a result, most stadiums have vacant areas or black backgrounds where the seats would be. This is known as either the "backdrop" or the batter's eye. The old Yankee Stadium featured black-painted vacant bleachers, nicknamed "the black" by baseball fans.

Many ballparks, especially those in Minor League Baseball, offer only bleacher seating. In those that offer both seats and bleachers—such as in Major League Baseball—the bleachers are typically in less desirable locations and/or have lower ticket prices, giving the term "bleachers" a connotation of lower-class seating.

American football 
The popularity of American football has made seating on outdoor and indoor football fields a necessity. Professional football, colleges, high schools, and even middle schools have bleacher systems set up to accommodate their fans.
American football bleachers are commonly made from concrete or aluminum with concrete footings or superstructure underneath.

In popular culture 
Bleachers feature in the film Grease, during the song “Summer Nights” (shot at Venice High School in Venice, California). 

Bleachers are mentioned in the song "White Moon" on the album Get Behind Me Satan by the White Stripes.

Bleachers are also mentioned in the song “You Belong With Me” on the album Fearless by Taylor Swift

Bleachers are also mentioned in the song "Highway 61 Revisited" by Bob Dylan

See also

 All-seater
 Mobile bleacher
 Grandstand
 Terrace (stadium)
 The gods (theatrical)
 Nosebleed seats

References

Nonbuilding structures
Outdoor structures
Sports venues